Michael Orlando Weetman Pearson, 4th Viscount Cowdray  (born 17 June 1944) of Cowdray Park in West Sussex, is a landowner in West Sussex with  and is a major shareholder of the FTSE 100 company Pearson plc, the construction, now publishing, company founded by his ancestor in the 19th century.

Origins
He is the eldest son and heir of Weetman Pearson, 3rd Viscount Cowdray (1910–1995) of Cowdray Park, Sussex and of Dunecht House, Aberdeenshire, by his first wife Lady Anne Pamela Bridgeman (1914-2009), a daughter of Orlando Bridgeman, 5th Earl of Bradford (1873–1957) and a first cousin of Princess Alice, Duchess of Gloucester. His parents separated when he was two years old. His great-grandfather, who founded the family's fortune, was the prominent businessman Weetman Dickinson Pearson, 1st Viscount Cowdray (1856–1927), created Viscount Cowdray in 1917. The  paternal estate of Dunecht in Scotland was inherited by his half-brother Charles Anthony Pearson (born 1956).

Career
He attended Gordonstoun, a boarding school in Elgin, Moray, Scotland, after which he served the British Army for two years, worked as a financier in the City of London and briefly as a farmer. In the late 1960s he became a film producer, running Cupid Productions, a film production company. He produced Sympathy for the Devil, a film starring The Rolling Stones and directed by Jean-Luc Godard, and Vanishing Point in 1971. In 1985, he was listed in Debrett's Peerage as a resident of Le Schuylkill, a high-rise building in Monaco. Later in the 1980s he returned to England. He was a director of the jewellers Theo Fennell Plc. He has served on the board of trustees of the Tibet House Trust for 20 years. and donates to the school project The Drukpa Kargyu Trust. He is a patron of his local primary school, church, young farmers club, and sports teams.

Cowdray Park estate

In 1995 he inherited his  paternal estate at Cowdray Park, in West Sussex, purchased by his great-grandfather in 1909, now containing the very large mansion house known as Cowdray Park, a well-known polo club (which hosts the Cowdray Park Gold Cup, one of Britain's most prestigious polo events), a golf club, organic dairy herd, forestry, 330 houses, several farms and much of the town of Midhurst. In September 2010 he moved out of the house to his previous and smaller residence at nearby Fernhurst, and in 2011, he put the 16 bedroom mansion house up for sale via agents Knight Frank, at an asking price of £25 million, including two lakes, two swimming pools, six cottages, 12 flats, a bowling alley, cricket pitch, polo field, but with only  of the estate. The property failed to find a buyer.

In 2017 having failed to find a buyer for the house, he took it off the market and drew up plans to convert the two wings into 7 short-leasehold luxury apartments with the reception areas to be hired out for conferences, corporate events and weddings. He retains the surrounding  estate, which has much commercial potential and employs 150 people, comprising a farm shop, cafe, golf, shooting grounds, fishing and therapy rooms for hire.

Marriages and progeny
In 1970 by his girlfriend Barbara Ray, he had a son out of wedlock:
Sebastian William Orlando Pearson (born 1970)
Firstly in 1977 he married Ellen Erhardt, a daughter of Hermann Erhardt, of Munich
Secondly in 1987 he married Marina Rose Cordle, 2nd daughter of John Cordle, a Conservative Member of Parliament, by whom he has five children: 
Eliza Anne Venetia Pearson (born 31 May 1988)
Emily Jane Marina Pearson (born 13 December 1989) 
Catrina Sophie Lavinia Pearson (born 13 March 1991)
Peregrine John Dickinson Pearson (born 27 October 1994), eldest legitimate son and heir; 
Montague Orlando William Pearson (born 17 May 1997).

Filmography

As a producer
Last of the Long-haired Boys (1968)
Sympathy for the Devil (1968)
The Legend of Spider Forest –   AKA Venom (1971)

As an executive producer
Vanishing Point (1971)

References

Living people
1944 births
Place of birth missing (living people)
People from Midhurst
People educated at Gordonstoun
4th
Michael
Deputy Lieutenants of West Sussex
English film producers
Cowdray